Nereicolidae is a family of crustaceans belonging to the order Cyclopoida.

Genera:
 Anomopsyllus Sars, 1921
 Chelonidiformis Hesse, 1869
 Nereicola Keferstein, 1863
 Pherma Wilson, 1923
 Selioides Levinsen, 1878
 Selius Krøyer, 1837
 Sigecheres Bresciani, 1964
 Vectoriella Stock, 1968

References

Cyclopoida